The North Chosen Line – specifically, the North Chosen West Line (北鮮西部線, Hokusen Seibu-sen; 북선서부선, Bukseon Seobu-seon) and the North Chosen East Line (北鮮東部線, Hokusen Tōbu-sen; 북선동부선, Bukseon Dongbu-seon) – was a railway line of the South Manchuria Railway in Japanese-occupied Korea from 1933 to 1945. Following Japan's defeat in the Pacific War and the subsequent partition of Korea, the line, being located entirely in the North, was taken over by the Korean State Railway as part of the Hambuk Line.

History

In order to create the shortest possible route from Japan to eastern Manchuria, the Chosen Government Railway (Sentetsu) began construction of a line from Unggi (now Sŏnbong) to Donggwanjin via Namyang in 1929. Named the East Domun Line, it reached Donggwanjin on 1 August 1933. There, it connected with the West Domun Line that Sentetsu had nationalised from the Domun Railway in 1929, and the entire Hoeryeong−Unggi line was then redesignated as the Domun Line, and Donggwanjin Station was renamed to Donggwan Station.

At the same time as the Namyang–Tonggwan section of the mainline was opened, a bridge was built over the Tumen River at Namyang, along with a line to Tumen, Manchukuo. This line, called the Namyang Gukgyeong Line (Namyang Border Line), connected Sentetsu to the Manchukuo National Railway's new Jingtu Line from Xinjing (now Changchun), capital of Manchukuo, to Tumen, that was also opened in 1933. This new route, using the northern port of Unggi, made the distance from Japan to Harbin even shorter than via Cheongjin. After the opening of the Manchukuo National's Tujia Line (图佳铁路) from Tumen to Jiamusi, also in 1933, an international passenger service from Gyeongseong to Botankou (Mudanjiang) via the Hamgyeong, Cheongjin, and Domun Lines, was inaugurated.

Just a few months after completion of the line from Unggi, on 1 October 1933 the management of Sentetsu's entire route from Cheongjin to Unggi was transferred to the South Manchuria Railway (Mantetsu). On 1 November 1934, Mantetsu rearranged these lines, merging the Namyang Border Line with the Unggi−Namyang section of the Domun Line to create the North Chosen East Line (Unggi–Namyang–Tumen), with the Namyang–Sangsambong section becoming the North Chosen West Line. In 1936, the "Asahi" express train between Xinjing and Najin was inaugurated, to connect to the ferry from Najin to Japan.

In addition to the connections to the Manchukuo National Railway at Sangsambong and Namyang, Mantetsu had a third connection to Manchukuo, via the privately owned East Manchuria Railway's bridge across the Tumen River at Hunyung.

Service on the line was suspended after the Soviet invasion at the end of the Pacific War. The damage sustained by the line during the war - including the destruction of the Tumen River bridges at both Hunyung and Sambong - was slow to be repaired due to strained relations between the Soviets and the Korean People's Committees; those two bridges have not been repaired to the present day. After the partition of Korea, the Provisional People’s Committee for North Korea nationalised all railways in the Soviet zone of occupation on 10 August 1946, and following the establishment of the DPRK, the Korean State Railway was created in 1948. After the end of the Korean War, the North Korean railway system was restructured, which included the rearrangement of several rail lines. This included the merging of the North Chosen West Line, the Namyang−Unggi section of the North Chosen East Line, and the Ungna Line to create the present-day Cheongjin−Namyang−Rajin Hambuk Line. The Namyang−Tumen cross-border section of the North Chosen East Line was split off to create the Namyang Gukgyeong Line.

Route

References

Railway lines in Korea
Mantetsu railway lines